Checkerspot was a biannual climate change magazine in Canada published by the Canadian Wildlife Federation. A free magazine, its inaugural issue was launched May 2007 and stopped production in 2009 due to the economic downturn.

Checkerspot claimed to be a climate neutral publication. The magazine was named after a butterfly whose ranges were believed to be shifting as a result of global warming.

Canadian Wildlife Federation 

The Canadian Wildlife Federation, one of Canada's largest non-profit, non-governmental conservation organizations, works to protect Canada's wild species and spaces.  Checkerspot was used to advance activism on and promote discussions about climate change.

References 
Checkerspot stops production

External links
Checkerspot Magazine

Biannual magazines published in Canada
Lifestyle magazines published in Canada
Climate change in Canada
Defunct magazines published in Canada
Environmental magazines
Magazines established in 2007
Magazines disestablished in 2009
Magazines published in Ottawa
2007 establishments in Ontario
2009 disestablishments in Ontario